HMS Affleck  was a  which served during World War II.

Originally destined for the US Navy as a turbo-electric (TE) type , HMS Affleck was provisionally given the name USS Oswald (later this name was reassigned to ).  However, the delivery was diverted to the Royal Navy before the launch.

Actions
HMS Affleck served exclusively with the 1st Escort Group taking part in operations in the North Atlantic, off Normandy, and in the English Channel.

When the damaged U-boat surfaced and tried to ram HMS Affleck, this action resulted in 36 dead and 16 survivors from U-91s crew.

On 1 March 1944 in the Northern Atlantic north of the Azores at position   HMS Affleck together with HMS Gore, HMS Gould and  sank  by the use of depth charges, resulting in 50 dead and 1 survivor from the submarine's crew.

On 16 March 1944 in the Straits of Gibraltar at position  HMS Affleck together with the destroyer  and three US Catalina aircraft (VP 63) sank  by the use of a hedgehog attack, resulting in 52 dead (all hands) from U-392s crew.

On 25 June 1944 HMS Affleck with  attacked a submarine believed to be  by the use of depth charges, this resulted in the sinking of the submarine with the loss of all hands. The Kriegsmarine had U-1191 listed as missing (no radio contact) since 12 June 1944.

This resulted in the sinking of Capel. Affleck was towed to port, where the ship was written off as a Constructive Total Loss.

Return to United States Navy
Affleck was returned to the US Navy in August 1945 in Britain, where she was sold on 24 January 1947 to the Lisbon-based Transcontinental Victory Commercial Corporation Ltd. She was renamed Nostra De La Luz and survived as a hulk until the 1970s.

General information
Pennant (UK): K 462
Pennant (US): DE 71

References

 The Captain Class Frigates in the Second World War by Donald Collingwood. published by Leo Cooper (1998), .
 The Buckley-Class Destroyer Escorts by Bruce Hampton Franklin, published by Chatham Publishing (1999), .
 German U-Boat Losses During World War II by Axel Niestle, published by United States Naval Inst (1998), .

External links
 Uboat.net page for HMS Affleck
 Uboat.net page for U-859
 Uboat.net page for U-91
 Uboat.net page for U-358
 Uboat.net page for U-392
 Uboat.net page for U-1191
 Uboat.net page for U-486
 captainclassfrigates.co.uk
 The Gazette 26 June 1945

Captain-class frigates
Buckley-class destroyer escorts
World War II frigates of the United Kingdom
Ships built in Hingham, Massachusetts
1943 ships
Maritime incidents in December 1944